Notter Point is a rocky point 6 nautical miles (11 km) northeast of Cape Kjellman forming the north extremity of Belitsa Peninsula and marking the west limit of Bone Bay, Trinity Peninsula. The name, applied by Argentina in 1953, memorializes Tomas Notter, a commander of English origin in Admiral Brown's squadron in the struggle for Argentine independence. He died fighting against the Spanish commander Romarate on March 21, 1814 aboard his small vessel Santisima Trinidad, when his vessel grounded under enemy batteries. Beaver Rocks are a group of rocks lying 2 nautical miles (4 km) off Belitsa Peninsula at a point midway between Notter Point and Cape Kjellman.

See also
Otter Rock (Antarctica)

Headlands of Trinity Peninsula